The 1998 Southland Conference baseball tournament was held from May 13 to 16, 1998 to determine the champion of the Southland Conference in the sport of college baseball for the 1998 season.  The event pitted the top six finishers from the conference's regular season in a double-elimination tournament held at Fair Grounds Field in Shreveport, Louisiana.  Fourth-seeded  won their first championship and claimed the automatic bid to the 1998 NCAA Division I baseball tournament.

Seeding and format
The top six finishers from the regular season were seeded one through six.  They played a double-elimination tournament.

Bracket and results

All-Tournament Team
The following players were named to the All-Tournament Team.

Most Valuable Player
Jacques Jobert was named Tournament Most Valuable Player.  Jobert was a second baseman for Nicholls State.

References

Tournament
Southland Conference Baseball Tournament
Southland Conference baseball tournament
Southland Conference baseball tournament